Parvin Ahmadinejad (born 3 February 1962) is an Iranian politician. She is the sister of former President, Mahmoud Ahmadinejad.

Career
Ahmedinejad served as an advisor at the presidential women office. She was a member of City Council of Tehran from 2007 to 2013.

She lost her bid for a seat from Garmsar and Aradan in the nation's parliamentary elections in 2012. She was not reelected in 2013 local elections.

Electoral history

See also 
 Davoud Ahmadinejad

References

21st-century Iranian women politicians
21st-century Iranian politicians
1962 births
Living people
Islamic Azad University, Central Tehran Branch alumni
Alliance of Builders of Islamic Iran politicians
People from Semnan Province
Mahmoud Ahmadinejad
Coalition of the Pleasant Scent of Servitude politicians
Tehran Councillors 2007–2013